Scholarine is an alkaloid isolated initially from Alstonia scholaris by Banerji and Siddhanta. Subsequently, it was obtained  from the West African tree Alstonia boonei.  The derivative N-Formylscholarine has been isolated from the fruit pods of Alstonia scholaris.

References

Scholarine from Alstonia scholaris: Banerji,  A.  and  Siddhanta,  A.K., "Schloraine: An Indole Alkaloid of Alstonia scholaris".  Phytochemistry, 20: 540–42, 1981.

External links
 A Review of the Ethnobotany and Pharmacological Importance of Alstonia boonei De Wild (Apocynaceae)

Tryptamine alkaloids
Heterocyclic compounds with 5 rings
Indolizidines
Methyl esters